Mšecké Žehrovice is a municipality and village in Rakovník District in the Central Bohemian Region of the Czech Republic. It has about 600 inhabitants.

Administrative parts
The village of Lodenice is an administrative part of Mšecké Žehrovice

See also
Mšecké Žehrovice Head, a Celtic sculpture (approx. 150–50 B.C.)

References

Villages in Rakovník District